In Greek mythology, Agamemnon (Agamémnōn) was a king of Mycenae who commanded the Greeks during the Trojan War. He was the son, or grandson, of King Atreus and Queen Aerope, the brother of Menelaus, the husband of Clytemnestra and the father of Iphigenia, Electra, Laodike (Λαοδίκη), Orestes and Chrysothemis. Legends make him the king of Mycenae or Argos, thought to be different names for the same area. Agamemnon was killed upon his return from Troy, either by his wife's lover Aegisthus or by his wife herself.

Etymology 
His name in Greek, Ἀγαμέμνων, means "very steadfast", "unbowed" or "resolute". The word comes from *Ἀγαμέδμων (*Agamédmōn) from ἄγαν, "very much" and μέδομαι, "think on".

Description 
In the account of Dares the Phrygian, Agamemnon was described as ". . .blond, large, and powerful. He was eloquent, wise, and noble, a man richly endowed."

Ancestry and early life
Agamemnon was a descendant of Pelops, son of Tantalus. According to the common story (as told in the Iliad and Odyssey of Homer), Agamemnon and his younger brother Menelaus were the sons of Atreus, king of Mycenae, and Aerope, daughter of the Cretan king Catreus. However, according to another tradition, Agamemnon and Menelaus were the sons of Atreus' son Pleisthenes, with their mother being Aerope, Cleolla, or Eriphyle. In this tradition, Pleisthenes dies young, with Agamemnon and Menelaus being raised by Atreus. Agamemnon had a sister Anaxibia (or Astyoche) who married Strophius, the son of Crisus.

Agamemnon's father, Atreus, murdered the sons of his twin brother Thyestes and fed them to Thyestes after discovering Thyestes' adultery with his wife Aerope. Thyestes fathered Aegisthus with his own daughter, Pelopia, and this son vowed gruesome revenge on Atreus' children. Aegisthus murdered Atreus, restored Thyestes to the throne, and took possession of the throne of Mycenae and jointly ruled with his father. During this period, Agamemnon and his brother Menelaus took refuge with Tyndareus, King of Sparta.

There they respectively married Tyndareus' daughters Clytemnestra and Helen. Agamemnon and Clytemnestra had four children: one son, Orestes, and three daughters, Iphigenia, Electra, and Chrysothemis. Menelaus succeeded Tyndareus in Sparta, while Agamemnon, with his brother's assistance, drove out Aegisthus and Thyestes to recover his father's kingdom. He extended his dominion by conquest and became the most powerful prince in Greece.

Agamemnon's family history had been tarnished by murder, incest, and treachery, consequences of the heinous crime perpetrated by his ancestor, Tantalus, and then of a curse placed upon Pelops, son of Tantalus, by Myrtilus, whom he had murdered. Thus misfortune hounded successive generations of the House of Atreus, until atoned by Orestes in a court of justice held jointly by humans and gods.

Trojan War

Sailing for Troy 

Agamemnon gathered the reluctant Greek forces to sail for Troy. In order to recruit Odysseus, who was feigning madness so as to not have to go to war, Agamemnon sent Palamedes, who threatened to kill Odysseus' infant son Telemachus. Odysseus was forced to stop acting mad in order to save his son and joined the assembled Greek forces.  Preparing to depart from Aulis, a port in Boeotia, Agamemnon's army incurred the wrath of the goddess Artemis. There are several reasons throughout myth for her wrath: in Aeschylus' play Agamemnon, Artemis is angry for the young men who will die at Troy, whereas in Sophocles' Electra, Agamemnon has slain an animal sacred to Artemis, and subsequently boasted that he was Artemis' equal in hunting. Misfortunes, including a plague and a lack of wind, prevented the army from sailing. Finally, the prophet Calchas announced that the wrath of the goddess could only be propitiated by the sacrifice of Agamemnon's daughter Iphigenia.

Classical dramatizations differ on how willing either father or daughter was to this fate; some include such trickery as claiming she was to be married to Achilles, but Agamemnon did eventually sacrifice Iphigenia. Her death appeased Artemis, and the Greek army set out for Troy. Several alternatives to the human sacrifice have been presented in Greek mythology. Other sources, such as Iphigenia at Aulis, say that Agamemnon was prepared to kill his daughter, but that Artemis accepted a deer in her place, and whisked her away to Tauris in the Crimean Peninsula. Hesiod said she became the goddess Hecate.

During the war, but before the events of the Iliad, Odysseus contrived a plan to get revenge on Palamedes for threatening his son’s life. By forging a letter from Priam, king of the Trojans, and caching some gold in Palamedes tent, Odysseus had Palamedes accused of treason, and Agamemnon ordered him stoned to death.

The Iliad 

The Iliad tells the story about the quarrel between Agamemnon and Achilles in the final year of the war. In book 1, following one of the Achaean Army's raids, Chryseis, daughter of Chryses, one of Apollo's priests, was taken as a war prize by Agamemnon. Chryses pleaded with Agamemnon to free his daughter but was met with little success. Chryses then prayed to Apollo for the safe return of his daughter, which Apollo responded to by unleashing a plague over the Achaean Army. After learning from the Prophet Calchas that the plague could be dispelled by returning Chryseis to her father, Agamemnon reluctantly agreed (but first berated Calchas for previously forcing Agamemnon to sacrifice his daughter Iphigenia) and released his prize. However, as compensation for his lost prize, Agamemnon demanded a new prize. He stole an attractive slave called Briseis, one of the spoils of war, from Achilles. This created a rift between Achilles and Agamemnon, causing Achilles to withdraw from battle and refuse to fight.

Agamemnon then received a dream from Zeus telling him to rally his forces and attack the Trojans in book 2. After several days of fighting, including duels between Menelaus and Paris, and between Ajax and Hector, the Achaeans were pushed back to the fortifications around their ships. In book 9, Agamemnon, having realized Achilles's importance in winning the war against the Trojan Army, sent ambassadors begging for Achilles to return, offering him riches and the hand of his daughter in marriage. Achilles refused, only being spurred back into action when Patroclus was killed in battle by Hector, eldest son of King Priam and Queen Hecuba. In book 19 Agamemnon reconciled with Achilles, giving him the offered rewards for returning to the war, before Achilles went out to turn back the Trojans and duel Hector. After Hector's death, Agamemnon assisted Achilles in performing Patroclus' funeral in book 23. Agamemnon volunteered for the javelin throwing contest, one of the games being held in Patroclus' honor, but his skill with the javelin is so well known that Achilles awarded him the prize without contest.

Although not the equal of Achilles in bravery, Agamemnon was a representative of "kingly authority". As commander-in-chief, he summoned the princes to the council and led the army in battle. His chief fault was his overwhelming haughtiness; an over-exalted opinion of his position that led him to insult Chryses and Achilles, thereby bringing great disaster upon the Greeks.

Agamemnon was the commander-in-chief of the Greeks during the Trojan War. During the fighting, Agamemnon killed Antiphus and fifteen other Trojan soldiers, according to one source. In the Iliad itself, he is shown to slaughter hundreds more in Book 11 during his aristea, loosely translated to "day of glory", which is the most similar to Achilles' aristea in Book 21. They both are compared to lions and destructive fires in battle, their hands are described as "splattered with gore" and "invincible," the Trojans flee to the walls, they both are appealed to by one of their victims, they are both avoided by Hector, they both are wounded in the arm or hand, and they both kill the one who wounded them. Even before his aristea, Agamemnon is considered to be one of the three best warriors on the Greek side, as proven when Hector challenges any champion of the Greek side to fight him in Book 7, and Agamemnon (along with Diomedes and Ajax the Greater) is one of the three Hector most wishes to fight out of the nine strongest Greek warriors who volunteer.

End of the war 

According to Sophocles's Ajax, after Achilles had fallen in battle Agamemnon and Menelaus award Achilles armor to Odysseus. This angers Ajax, who feels he is the now the strongest among the Achaean warriors and so deserves the armor. Ajax considers killing them, but is driven to madness by Athena and instead slaughters the herdsmen and cattle that had not yet been divided as spoils of war. He then commits suicide in shame for his actions. As Ajax dies he curses the sons of Atreus (Agamemnon and Menelaus), along with the entire Achaean army. Agamemnon and Menelaus consider leaving Ajax's body to rot, denying him a proper burial, but are convinced otherwise by Odysseus and Ajax's half-brother Teucer. After the capture of Troy, Cassandra, the doomed prophetess and daughter of Priam, fell to Agamemnon's lot in the distribution of the prizes of war.

Return to Greece and death 

After a stormy voyage, Agamemnon and Cassandra land in Argolis, or, in another version, are blown off course and land in Aegisthus's country. Clytemnestra, Agamemnon's wife, has taken Aegisthus, son of Thyestes, as a lover. When Agamemnon comes home he is slain by Aegisthus (in the oldest versions of the story) or by Clytemnestra. According to the accounts given by Pindar and the tragedians, Agamemnon is slain in a bath by his wife alone, after being ensnared by a blanket or a net thrown over him to prevent resistance.

In Homer's version of the story in the Odyssey, Aegisthus ambushes and kills Agamemnon in a feasting hall under the pretense of holding a feast in honor of Agamemnon's return home from Troy. Clytemnestra also kills Cassandra. Her jealousy of Cassandra, and her wrath at the sacrifice of Iphigenia and at Agamemnon's having gone to war over Helen of Troy, are said to be the motives for her crime.

Aegisthus and Clytemnestra then rule Agamemnon's kingdom for a time, Aegisthus claiming his right of revenge for Atreus's crimes against Thyestes (Thyestes then crying out "thus perish all the race of Pleisthenes!", thus explaining Aegisthus' action as justified by his father's curse). Agamemnon's son Orestes later avenges his father's murder, with the help or encouragement of his sister Electra, by murdering Aegisthus and Clytemnestra (his own mother), thereby inciting the wrath of the Erinyes (English: the Furies), winged goddesses who track down wrongdoers with their hounds' noses and drive them to insanity.

The Curse of the House of Atreus 
Agamemnon's family history is rife with misfortune, born from several curses contributing to the miasma around the family. The curse begins with Agamemnon's great-grandfather Tantalus, who is in Zeus's favor until he tries to feed his son Pelops to the gods in order to test their omniscience, as well as stealing some ambrosia and nectar. Tantalus is then banished to the underworld, where he stands in a pool of water that evaporates every time he reaches down to drink, and above him is a fruit tree whose branches are blown just out of reach by the wind whenever he reaches for the fruit. This begins the cursed house of Atreus, and his descendants would face similar or worse fates.

Later, using his relationship with Poseidon, Pelops convinces the god to grant him a chariot so he may beat Oenomaus, king of Pisa, in a race, and win the hand of his daughter Hippodamia. Myrtilus, who in some accounts helps Pelops win his chariot race, attempts to lie with Pelops's new bride Hippodamia. In anger, Pelops throws Myrtilus off a cliff, but not before Myrtilus curses Pelops and his entire line. Pelops and Hippodamia have many children, including Atreus and Thyestes, who are said to have murdered their half-brother Chrysippus. Pelops banishes Atreus and Thyestes to Mycanae, where Atreus becomes king. Thyestes later conspires with Atreus's wife, Aerope, to supplant Atreus, but they are unsuccessful. Atreus then kills Thyestes' son and cooks him into a meal which Thyestes eats, and afterwards Atreus taunts him with the hands and feet of his now dead son. Thyestes, on the advice of an oracle, then has a son with his own daughter Pelopia. Pelopia tries to expose the infant Aegisthus, but he is found by a shepherd and raised in the house of Atreus. When Aegisthus reaches adulthood Thyestes reveals the truth of his birth, and Aegithus then kills Atreus.

Atreus and Aerope have three children, Agamemnon, Menelaus, and Anaxibia. The continued miasma surrounding the house of Atreus expresses itself in several events throughout their lives. Agamemnon is forced to sacrifice his own daughter, Iphigenia, to appease the gods and allow the Greek forces to sail for Troy. When Agamemnon refuses to return Chryseis to her father Chryses, he brings plague upon the Greek camp. He is also later killed by his wife, Clytemnestra, who conspires with her new lover Aegisthus in revenge for the death of Iphigenia. Menelaus's wife, Helen of Troy, runs away with Paris, ultimately leading to the Trojan War. According to book 4 of the Odyssey, after the war his fleet is scattered by the gods to Egypt and Crete. When Menelaus finally returns home, his marriage with Helen is now strained and they produce no sons. Both Agamemnon and Menelaus are cursed by Ajax for not granting him Achilles's armor as he commits suicide.

Agamemnon and Clytemnestra have three remaining children, Electra, Orestes, and Chrysothemis. After growing to adulthood and being pressured by Electra, Orestes vows to avenge his father Agamemnon by killing his mother Clytemnestra and Aegisthus. After successfully doing so, he wanders the Greek countryside for many years constantly plagued by the Erinyes (Furies) for his sins. Finally, with the help of Athena and Apollo he is absolved of his crimes, dispersing the miasma, and the curse on house Atreus comes to an end.

Other stories 
Athenaeus tells a tale of how Agamemnon mourns the loss of his friend or lover Argynnus, when he drowns in the Cephisus river. He buries him, honored with a tomb and a shrine to Aphrodite Argynnis. This episode is also found in Clement of Alexandria, in Stephen of Byzantium (Kopai and Argunnos), and in Propertius, III with minor variations.
 
The fortunes of Agamemnon have formed the subject of numerous tragedies, ancient and modern, the most famous being the Oresteia of Aeschylus. In the legends of the Peloponnesus, Agamemnon was regarded as the highest type of a powerful monarch, and in Sparta he was worshipped under the title of Zeus Agamemnon. His tomb was pointed out among the ruins of Mycenae and at Amyclae.

In works of art, there is considerable resemblance between the representations of Zeus, king of the gods, and Agamemnon, king of men. He is generally depicted with a sceptre and diadem, conventional attributes of kings.

Agamemnon's mare is named Aetha. She is also one of two horses driven by Menelaus at the funeral games of Patroclus.

In Homer's Odyssey Agamemnon makes an appearance in the kingdom of Hades after his death. There, the former king meets Odysseus and explains just how he was murdered before he offers Odysseus a warning about the dangers of trusting a woman.

Agamemnon is a character in William Shakespeare's play Troilus and Cressida, set during the Trojan War.

In media and art

Visual arts

General works 

 The Mask of Agamemnon, discovered by Heinrich Schliemann in 1876, on display at National Archeological Museum of Athens, Athens
 The Tomb of Agamemnon, by Louis Desprez, 1787, on display at The Metropolitan Museum of Art, New York
 Clytemnestra and Agamemnon, by Pierre-Narcisse Guérin, 1817, on display at the Musée des Beaux-Arts d'Orléans, Orléans
 Electra at the Tomb of Agamemnon, by Frederic Leighton, 1868, on display at Ferens Art Gallery, Kingston upon Hull
 Agamemnon Killing Odios, anonymous, 1545, on display at The Metropolitan Museum of Art, New York

With Iphigenia 

 Sacrifice of Iphigenia, by Arnold Houbraken, 1690–1700, on display at the Rijks Museum, Amsterdam
 The Sacrifice of Iphigenia, by Charles de la Fosse, 1680, on display at the Palace of Versailles, Versailles
 The Sacrifice of Iphigenia, by Gaetano Gandolfi, 1789, on display at The Metropolitan Museum of Art, New York
 Sacrificio di Ifigenia, by Pietro Testa, 1640
 The Sacrifice of Iphigenia, by Giovanni Battista Tiepolo, 1757, on display at the Villa Varmarana, Vicenza
 Sacrifice of Iphigenia, by Jan Steen, 1671, on display at the Leiden Collection, New York
 The Sacrifice of Iphigenia, by Sebastian Bourdon, 1653, on display at the Musée des Beaux-Arts d'Orléans, Orléans

With Achilles 

 The Quarrel Between Agamemnon and Achilles, by Giovanni Battista Gaulli, 1695, on display at the Museé de l’Oise, Beauvais
 The Anger of Achilles, by Jacques-Louis David, 1819, on display at Kimbell Art Museum, Fort Worth
 The Wrath of Achilles, by Michel-Martin Drolling, 1810, on display at the École des Beaux-Arts, Paris
 Quarrel of Achilles and Agamemnon, by William Page, on display at the Smithsonian American Art Museum, Washington DC

Portrayal in film and television 
 The 1924 film Helena by Karl Wüstenhagen
 The 1956 film Helen of Troy by Robert Douglas
 The 1961 film The Trojan Horse by Nerio Bernardi
 The 1962 film The Fury of Achilles by Mario Petri
 The 1962 film Electra by Theodoros Dimitriou
 The 1968 TV miniseries The Odyssey by Rolf Boysen
 The 1977 film Iphigenia by Kostas Kazakos
 The 1981 film Time Bandits by Sean Connery 
 The 1997 TV miniseries The Odyssey by Yorgo Voyagis
 The 2003 TV miniseries Helen of Troy by Rufus Sewell
 The 2004 film Troy by Brian Cox
 The 2018 TV miniseries Troy: Fall of a City by Johnny Harris

See also 
 HMS Agamemnon
 National Archaeological Museum of Athens

Citations

General references

Secondary sources 
 Aeschylus, Agamemnon in Aeschylus, with an English translation by Herbert Weir Smyth, Ph. D. in two volumes, Vol 2, Cambridge, Massachusetts, Harvard University Press, 1926, Online version at the Perseus Digital Library.
 Apollodorus, Apollodorus, The Library, with an English Translation by Sir James George Frazer, F.B.A., F.R.S. in 2 Volumes. Cambridge, Massachusetts, Harvard University Press; London, William Heinemann Ltd. 1921. Online version at the Perseus Digital Library.
 Athenaeus, The Learned Banqueters, Volume VI: Books 12-13.594b, edited and translated by S. Douglas Olson, Loeb Classical Library No. 345, Cambridge, Massachusetts, Harvard University Press, 2011. . Online version at Harvard University Press.
 Collard, Christopher and Martin Cropp (2008a), Euripides Fragments: Aegeus–Meleanger,  Loeb Classical Library No. 504, Cambridge, Massachusetts, Harvard University Press, 2008. . Online version at Harvard University Press.
 Collard, Christopher and Martin Cropp (2008b), Euripides Fragments: Oedipus-Chrysippus: Other Fragments,  Loeb Classical Library No. 506, Cambridge, Massachusetts, Harvard University Press, 2008. . Online version at Harvard University Press.
 Dictys Cretensis, The Trojan War. The Chronicles of Dictys of Crete and Dares the Phrygian, translated by R. M. Frazer (Jr.). Indiana University Press. 1966.
 Euripides, Helen, translated by E. P. Coleridge in  The Complete Greek Drama, edited by Whitney J. Oates and Eugene O'Neill, Jr. Volume 2. New York. Random House. 1938. Online version at the Perseus Digital Library.
 Euripides, Iphigenia in Tauris, translated by Robert Potter in The Complete Greek Drama, edited by Whitney J. Oates and Eugene O'Neill, Jr. Volume 2. New York. Random House. 1938. Online version at the Perseus Digital Library.
 Euripides, Orestes, translated by E. P. Coleridge in The Complete Greek Drama, edited by Whitney J. Oates and Eugene O'Neill, Jr. Volume 1. New York. Random House. 1938. Online version at the Perseus Digital Library.
 Gantz, Timothy, Early Greek Myth: A Guide to Literary and Artistic Sources, Johns Hopkins University Press, 1996, Two volumes:  (Vol. 1),  (Vol. 2).
 Grimal, Pierre, The Dictionary of Classical Mythology, Wiley-Blackwell, 1996. .
 Hard, Robin, The Routledge Handbook of Greek Mythology: Based on H.J. Rose's "Handbook of Greek Mythology", Psychology Press, 2004, . Google Books.
 Homer, The Iliad with an English Translation by A.T. Murray, Ph.D. in two volumes. Cambridge, MA., Harvard University Press; London, William Heinemann, Ltd. 1924. Online version at the Perseus Digital Library.
 Homer, The Odyssey with an English Translation by A.T. Murray, PH.D. in two volumes. Cambridge, MA., Harvard University Press; London, William Heinemann, Ltd. 1919. Online version at the Perseus Digital Library.
 Hyginus, Gaius Julius, Fabulae, in The Myths of Hyginus, edited and translated by Mary A. Grant, Lawrence: University of Kansas Press, 1960. Online version at ToposText.
 Most, G.W., Hesiod: The Shield, Catalogue of Women, Other Fragments, Loeb Classical Library, No. 503, Cambridge, Massachusetts, Harvard University Press, 2007, 2018. . Online version at Harvard University Press.
 Parada, Carlos, Genealogical Guide to Greek Mythology, Jonsered, Paul Åströms Förlag, 1993. .
 Pausanias, Pausanias Description of Greece with an English Translation by W.H.S. Jones, Litt.D., and H.A. Ormerod, M.A., in 4 Volumes. Cambridge, Massachusetts, Harvard University Press; London, William Heinemann Ltd. 1918. Online version at the Perseus Digital Library.
 Sophocles, The Ajax of Sophocles. Edited with introduction and notes by Sir Richard Jebb, Sir Richard Jebb. Cambridge. Cambridge University Press. 1893 Online version at the Perseus Digital Library.

Primary sources 
 Homer, Iliad
 Euripides, Electra
 Sophocles, Electra
 Seneca, Agamemnon
 Aeschylus, The Libation Bearers
 Homer, Odyssey I, 28–31; XI, 385–464
 Aeschylus, Agamemnon
 Apollodorus, Epitome, II, 15 – III, 22; VI, 23

External links 
 Agamemnon – World History Encyclopedia

Achaean Leaders
 
Deeds of Artemis
Filicides
Greek mythological heroes
Kings in Greek mythology
Kings of Mycenae
Metamorphoses characters